"Rock the Boat" is a song by French music producer and DJ Bob Sinclar, featuring Pitbull, Dragonfly and Fatman Scoop. It was released on 19 December 2011. The single peaked at number 22 on the French charts.

Music video
A music video to accompany the release of "Rock the Boat" was first released onto YouTube on January 21, 2012 at a total length of three minutes and eight seconds. Pitbull does not appear on the video.
The singers are the French Bob Sinclair, the Colombian Dragonfly and the Americans Fatman Scoop and Pitbull.

Formats and track listings
Digital download

"Rock the Boat" (Original Version) – 3:54
"Rock the Boat" (Radio Edit) – 3:08

6 track CD single – X Energy Italy – X 12384.12 CDS
"Rock the Boat" (Original Radio Edit) – 3:08
"Rock the Boat" (Original Club Version) – 5:06
"Rock the Boat" (Martin Solveig Remix) – 5:42
"Rock the Boat" (Bassjackers & Yellow Claw Remix) – 5:36
"Rock the Boat" (Ilan Khan Remix) – 6:19
"Rock the Boat" (Cutee B. Remix) – 5:49

Credits and personnel
Bob Sinclar – producer, keyboards, arranger, instrumentation, recording and mixing
Armando C. Perez – vocals, songwriter
Dragonfly – vocals
Christophe Le Friant – songwriter
Kinnda Kee Hamid – songwriter
Maurizio Zoffoli – songwriter
David A. Stewart – songwriter
Annie Lennox – songwriter

Source:

Charts

Weekly charts

Year-end charts

Certifications

References

Bob Sinclar songs
2011 singles
Pitbull (rapper) songs
Fatman Scoop songs
Songs written by Annie Lennox
Songs written by David A. Stewart
Songs written by Kinnda
2011 songs
Songs written by Pitbull (rapper)
Songs written by Bob Sinclar
Ministry of Sound singles